Albergati is an Italian surname. Notable people with the surname include:

Niccolò Albergati (1373–1443), Italian cardinal
Pirro Albergati (1663–1735), Italian aristocrat and composer
Fabio Albergati (1538–1606), Italian diplomat

See also
Niccolò Albergati-Ludovisi (1608–1687), Italian cardinal

Italian-language surnames